Ian Dev Singh is an Indian cricketer who plays predominantly as a batsman. He was captain of Jammu and Kashmir in the Ranji Trophy in 2013-14.

Early life 
Ian Dev Singh was born in Gandhinagar, Jammu and named after Ian Botham and Kapil Dev, his father's two favourite cricketers. He completed his Bachelor of Engineering degree at D. Y. Patil University in Navi Mumbai while simultaneously playing Ranji Trophy cricket, occasionally necessitating flying in to sit an exam directly between Jammu and Kashmir fixtures.

Career
Jammu and Kashmir's cricketing infrastructure remains somewhat underdeveloped, and Dev Singh developed as a cricketer by playing club cricket in Mumbai. He noted in 2012 that, '[t]he competition even at the club level [in Mumbai] is very tough whereas back in our state, we get limited opportunities. We rarely get solid preparation before the Ranji season commences.'

Another major influence on the development of his game was former India captain Bishan Bedi, coach of Jammu and Kashmir between 2011 and 2014. With Bedi's guidance helping him overhaul his mental approach to batting, Dev Singh scored 406 runs at 67.66 in first-class matches in 2011–12, and earned selection for North Zone in the Duleep Trophy. For his part, Bedi described Dev Singh as 'a very good shorter version batsman and a brilliant fielder' who was 'definitely ready for a break', either in the form of an international call-up or an IPL contract. As of 2017, however, such honours have eluded him.

References

External links 

1989 births
Living people
Indian cricketers
Jammu and Kashmir cricketers
Cricketers from Jammu and Kashmir
India Green cricketers
Kandy Customs Sports Club cricketers